Born to Be Free is the second full-length album by Icelandic musician Borko. It was released in October 2012.

Track listing 
 "Born to Be Free" – 4:28
 "Hold Me Now" – 3:38
 "Abandoned in the Valley of Knives" – 5:41
 "Two Lights" – 5:11
 "Waking Up to Be" – 6:22
 "Bodies" – 5:16
 "The Final Round" – 3:52
 "Yonder" – 5:38
 "Sing to the World" – 7:17

Borko albums
2012 albums